Kate Taylor is the second studio album by singer Kate Taylor, released May 4, 1978. The album included Taylor's sole chart single: her version of  "It's in His Kiss (The Shoop Shoop Song)", recorded in August 1977 to peak at number 49 that autumn; the Kate Taylor album also introduced the singer's remakes of "A Fool in Love", "It's Growin'" and "Stubborn Kind of Woman" (originally "Stubborn Kind of Fellow"); the track "It's Growin'" was issued as a single in July 1978. The album's other tracks included the debut versions of two James Taylor compositions: "Happy Birthday Sweet Darling" and "Slow and Steady", and also Kate Taylor's rendition of "Rodeo", composed by her brother Livingston Taylor for his 1973 album Over the Rainbow. Kate Taylor also included the B-side of "It's in His Kiss": the self-penned "Jason & Ida", and introduced "Tiah's Cove" — written by Kate Taylor's husband Charlie Witham – and also the Walter Robinson composition "Harriet Tubman": the latter is described by James Taylor biographer Timothy White as "a searing latterday spiritual" which is "the highpoint of Kate's exceptional eleven song set."

Track listing
 "A Fool in Love" — (Ike Turner)
 "Smuggler's Song" — (Clay Jackson, Ethan Singer)
 "Harriet Tubman" — (Walter Robinson)
 "Stubborn Kind of Woman" — (Marvin Gaye, William "Mickey" Stevenson, George Gordy)
 "Happy Birthday Sweet Darling" — (James Taylor)
 "It's in His Kiss" — (Rudy Clark)
 "Slow and Steady" — (James Taylor, Zach Wiesner)
 "It's Growin'" — (Warren "Pete" Moore, Smokey Robinson)
 "Tiah's Cove" — (Charlie Witham)
 "Rodeo" — (Livingston Taylor)
 "Jason & Ida" — (Duane Giesemann, Kate Taylor)

Personnel
 Kate Taylor – vocals 
 Kenny Ascher — piano
 Rubens Bassini — percussion 
 Errol "Crusher" Bennett – percussion 
 Kenneth Bichel — piano 
 Randy Brecker — trumpet, tenor saxophone 
 Don Brooks — harmonica 
 Ron Carter — bass 
 Ronnie Cuber — baritone saxophone
 Jessy Dixon — backing vocals 
 Cornell Dupree — guitar 
 Steve Ferrone — drums 
 Steve Gadd — drums 
 Don Grolnick — organ, piano 
 John Hall – backing vocals 
 Elsa Harris – backing vocals 
 Bingo Hodges – backing vocals 
 Will Lee — bass 
 Tony Levin — bass 
 Ralph MacDonald — percussion 
 Arif Mardin — strings, arranger 
 Lou Marini — tenor saxophone
 Onnie McIntyre – guitar 
 Jeff Mironov – guitar 
 Gary Mure – drums 
 Alan Rubin — trumpet 
 David Sanborn — alto saxophone
 Carly Simon — backing vocals 
 David Spinozza — arranger, horn 
 Alex Taylor — backing vocals 
 David Taylor – trombone 
 James Taylor — guitar, arranger, horn, backing vocals 
 Richard Tee — piano 
 David Tofani – tenor saxophone

References

1978 albums
Kate Taylor albums
CBS Records albums